The Zeitschrift der Deutschen Morgenländischen Gesellschaft (English: "Journal of the German Oriental Society") is a peer-reviewed academic journal covering Oriental studies, published by Harrassowitz Verlag on behalf of the Deutsche Morgenländische Gesellschaft. It was established in 1847 and the editor-in-chief is Florian C. Reiter (Humboldt University of Berlin).

Digitisation 
The journal has been digitized and is available from  the University of Halle.  The journal is available from 1847 to 2013, together with various indexes and supplements, including the Deutscher Orientalistentag volumes from 1968 to 1995.

References

External links

Oriental studies
Multilingual journals
Publications established in 1847
1847 establishments in Germany
Area studies journals
Harrassowitz Verlag academic journals
Biannual journals